Asaphocrita estriatella is a moth in the family Blastobasidae. It is found in North America, including Nova Scotia, Massachusetts and Maine.

References

Moths described in 1910
Asaphocrita